Jersie or Jersie Strand is a town  south-west of central Copenhagen and form the southern part of the Solrød Strand urban area. The suburb is connected with the radial line Køgebugtbanen, a part of the S-train network, at the Jersie station.

The village of Jersie, west of Jersie Strand, has a population of 526 (1 January 2022).  Jersie Church is located in the village.

Notable people 
 Carl Berntsen (1913 in Jersie – 2004) a Danish sailor, competed in the 8 Metre event at the 1936 Summer Olympics
 Jeanette Dyrkjær (1963 – 2011 in Jersie Beach) a Danish nude model and adult actress 
 Morten Lund (born 1972 in Jersie) entrepreneur, founded or co-invested in more than 100 high-tech start ups

References

Neighbourhoods in Denmark
Villages in Denmark
Solrød Municipality